Stagg is a surname. Notable people with the surname include:

Amos Alonzo Stagg (1862–1965), American collegiate coach in multiple sports, primarily football
Amos Alonzo Stagg Jr. (1899–1996), American football player and football and basketball coach
Barry Stagg (born 1944), Canadian musician, composer and play writer
C. Tracey Stagg (1878–1939), New York state senator
Charlotte Stagg, British neurophysiologist
Colin Stagg, the man wrongly imprisoned in the Rachel Nickell murder case (1992)
David Stagg (born 1983), Australian rugby league player
Emmet Stagg (born 1944), Irish Labour Party politician
Frank Stagg (disambiguation), several people
Sir James Stagg (1900–1975), Royal Air Force meteorologist who persuaded General Dwight D. Eisenhower to change the date of the Allied invasion of Europe
Jesse Stagg (born 1970), American creative director and producer
John Stagg (poet) (1770–1823), English poet
Lindsey Stagg (born 1970), English former child actor
Paul Stagg (1909–1992), American football player, coach, and college athletics administrator
Peter Stagg (born 1941), Scottish rugby union player
Sir Richard Stagg (born 1955), British ambassador
Siobhan Stagg (born 1987), Australian opera soprano
Tom Stagg (judge) (1923–2015), U.S. district judge in the Western District of Louisiana

See also
George T. Stagg, a limited-production bourbon whiskey distributed by Buffalo Trace Distillery
Stagg Chili, a brand of chili con carne made by Hormel
Stagg Field, two different football fields for the University of Chicago
Stagg Memorial Stadium, a 28,000-seat multi-purpose stadium in Stockton, California
Stagg Music,  a Flemish musical instrument manufacturer
SS John Stagg, a tanker ship (1943–1968)
Jonathan Stagge, one of the pseudonyms used by the mystery writers known as Patrick Quentin
Leeroy Stagger, Canadian singer
Staggs (disambiguation)
Stag (disambiguation)